Wladimir d'Ormesson (2 August 1888, Saint Petersburg – 15 September 1973) was a French essayist, novelist, journalist and diplomat.

He was successively ambassador in Vatican City, Buenos Aires and Santiago, and wrote many essays (Dans la nuit européenne, La Confiance de l'Allemagne) and some novels (La Préface d'une vie). D'Ormesson was elected to the Académie française in 1956.  He was also the president of the Office de radiodiffusion télévision française.

Works
Les Jets d'eau, 1913
La Préface d'une vie, 1919
Nos illusions sur l'Europe centrale, 1922
"La Question de Tanger", Revue de Paris, 1922
Dans la nuit européenne, 1923
Les résultats de la politique de la Ruhr, 1924
Portraits d'hier et d'aujourd'hui, 1927
La Première Mission de la France aux États-Unis, 1928
La Confiance de l'Allemagne ?, 1929
Enfances diplomatique, souvenirs, 1931
La Grande Crise mondiale de 1857, 1932
La Révolution allemande, 1934
Qu'est-ce qu'un Français ?, 1935
Vue cavalière de l'Europe, 1936
L'Éternel Problème allemand, 1945
La Ville éternelle, 1956
Mission à Rome, 1957
La Ville et les Champs, 1958
La Papauté, 1958
Les vraies confidences, 1962
Auprès de Lyautey, 1963
Présence du Général de Gaulle, 1971
Les Propos, 1973

References 
online biography (in French)

External links
 

1888 births
1973 deaths
Writers from Saint Petersburg
Grand Croix of the Légion d'honneur
Members of the Académie Française
French male novelists
20th-century French novelists
20th-century French male writers
French diplomats